Mashfi Al-Mutairi (born July 19, 1973 in Kuwait City) is a Kuwaiti sport shooter. He won a bronze medal in double trap shooting at the 1998 Asian Games in Bangkok, Thailand, and was eventually selected to compete for the Kuwaiti team in two editions of the Olympic Games (2000 and 2004). Al-Mutairi is a member of the Kuwait City Shooting Club, where he trains full-time under Italian-born coach and 1996 Olympian Mirco Cenci.

Al-Mutairi's Olympic debut came at the 2000 Summer Olympics in Sydney, where he shot 134 out of 150 hits to force a two-way tie for tenth place with Finland's Raimo Kauppila in the men's double trap, just five targets away from the final cutoff.

At the 2004 Summer Olympics in Athens, Al-Mutairi qualified for his second Kuwaiti team in the men's double trap, after having achieved a minimum qualifying score of 137 from his second-place finish at the Asian Championships in Kuala Lumpur, Malaysia. Al-Mutairi marked a score of 131 out of 150 targets to finish in twelfth from a field of twenty-five shooters in the qualifying phase, failing to advance to the final round.

References

External links
 

1973 births
Living people
Kuwaiti male sport shooters
Olympic shooters of Kuwait
Shooters at the 2000 Summer Olympics
Shooters at the 2004 Summer Olympics
Shooters at the 1998 Asian Games
Shooters at the 2002 Asian Games
Shooters at the 2006 Asian Games
Shooters at the 2010 Asian Games
Asian Games medalists in shooting
Sportspeople from Kuwait City
Asian Games silver medalists for Kuwait
Asian Games bronze medalists for Kuwait
Medalists at the 1998 Asian Games
Medalists at the 2010 Asian Games